Microcentro may refer to:

 San Nicolás, Buenos Aires
 Buenos Aires Central Business District